is a railway station in Nobeoka, Miyazaki, Japan.

Lines

Layout 
The station consists of a side platform serving a single track at grade. The station building is a simple shed built in log cabin style which serves only to house a waiting area and automatic ticket machine.

Adjacent stations

History
JR Kyushu opened the station on 13 March 1988 as an additional station on the existing track of the Nippō Main Line.

Passenger statistics
In fiscal 2016, the station was used by an average of 131 passengers (boarding only) per day.

See also
List of railway stations in Japan

References

External links 

Asahigaoka (JR Kyushu)

Railway stations in Miyazaki Prefecture
Railway stations in Japan opened in 1988
Nobeoka, Miyazaki